Friseria is a genus of moths in the family Gelechiidae.

Species
 Friseria acaciella (Busck, 1906)
 Friseria caieta Hodges, 1966
 Friseria cockerelli (Busck, 1903)
 Friseria flammulella (Walsingham, 1897)
 Friseria infracta (Walsingham, 1911)
 Friseria lacticaput (Walsingham, 1911)
 Friseria nona Hodges, 1966
 Friseria paphlactis (Meyrick, 1912)
 Friseria repentina (Walsingham, 1911)

References

 
Gelechiini